The Dominican Republic Cycling Federation (in Spanish: Federación Dominicana de Ciclismo) is the national governing body of cycle racing in the Dominican Republic.

It is a member of the UCI and COPACI.

It covers the disciplines of road racing, track cycling, cyclo-cross, BMX, mountain biking and cycle speedway.

See also
Vuelta a la Independencia Nacional

References

External links
 Dominican Republic Cycling Federation official website

Dominican Republic
Cycle racing organizations
Cycle racing in the Dominican Republic
Cycling